The Maltese Cannoneers was an artillery company within the British Army which existed from 1794 to 1802. It was the first Maltese military unit in British service.

History

The unit was raised covertly while Malta was still ruled by the Order of St. John. It was recruited by the Chevalier De Sade on the orders of the Viceroy of Corsica, Sir Gilbert Elliot. De Sade arrived in Malta in December 1794, with the aim of acquiring ordnance requirements and raise a company of artillerymen. De Sade and the company of 140 military artificers and engineers returned to Corsica in May 1795, taking with them 230 half-barrels of powder. Elliot was impressed with the men and stated that:

The Maltese Cannoneers were amalgamated with a company of French Marine Refugee Artillery in 1796. They served in Portugal until June 1802, and the unit was disbanded the following August at East Cowes on the Isle of Wight. The men returned to Malta, which by then had become a British protectorate.

References

Artillery units and formations of the British Army
Company sized units of the British Army
Military history of Malta
Military units and formations established in 1794
Military units and formations disestablished in 1802
1794 establishments in Malta
1802 disestablishments in Malta